Harmony, Incorporated, is an international organization of women singers whose purpose is to empower all women through education, friendship and singing.  Founded by 1959 by Peggy Rigby, Charlotte Sneddon, Mary Avis Hedges, Jeanne Maino and Mary Perry in Providence, Rhode Island, the organization currently has just under 2000 members in the United States and Canada and is closely affiliated with the Barbershop Harmony Society.

History 

In 1957, several members of Sweet Adelines International (SAI) broke from the organization in protest of the policy limiting membership to Caucasian women.  In 1958, chapters from Rhode Island, Massachusetts, and Orillia, Ontario, also left SAI to form Harmony, Incorporated.

Harmony, Inc. was incorporated in the State of Rhode Island on February 26, 1959. The founding member chapters of Harmony, Inc. were the Melody Belles of Providence, Rhode Island; Sea Gals of New Bedford, Massachusetts; The Harmonettes from North Attleboro, Massachusetts; Harmony Belles of Barrie-Orillia, Ontario; and the Harborettes from Scituate, Massachusetts.

1963, a Sweet Adeline chapter in Ottawa, Ontario was threatened with expulsion after accepting a black woman, Lana Clowes, as a member. As a result, Ottawa's Capital Chordettes left SAI to become the seventh chapter to join Harmony, Incorporated.

In 2013, Harmony, Inc. announced the creation of the Affiliate membership category, extending membership to men involved with the organization.

Contests 
Harmony, Inc. annually holds international and area-level conventions and contests for choruses and quartets to improve singing, conduct meetings and provide educational instruction.

Quartets who win the international gold medal are called "Harmony Queens," and are considered champions forever and may not compete again. A chorus that wins the gold must sit out of competition one year and may compete for the gold medal again in the second year following their championship.

Quartet champions

Chorus champions 
 New England Voices in Harmony, from Nashua, New Hampshire, two-time International Chorus Champions (2014, 2018)
 Northern Blend Chorus from Watertown, New York, three-time International Chorus Champions (2010, 2017, 2022). Their 2017 championship ended The Village Vocal Chords' streak of 19 consecutive championships.
 A Cappella Showcase from Milton, Ontario, four-time International Chorus Champions (2009, 2012, 2016, 2019)
 The Village Vocal Chords based in Metro Chicago, Illinois, are twenty-time International Chorus Champions, with the most international gold medals in Harmony, Inc., 19 of which were in succession (each time the chorus was eligible to compete) since 1979.
 Derby City Chorus from Louisville, Kentucky, are five-time International Chorus Champions (1998, 2000, 2002, 2004, 2006)
 The Harmonettes, one of the founding chapters of Harmony, Inc. are nine-time International Chorus Champions (1961, 1962, 1963, 1965, 1967, 1969, 1970, 1971, 1977)
 Capital Chordettes from Ottawa, Ontario, three-time International Chorus Champions (1984, 1988, 1996)

Areas 

Harmony, Inc. is divided into geographical areas, and the membership of an Area consists of all the chapters and Associate members assigned to it by the International Board of Directors (IBOD).

For purposes of administration (particularly of local schools and contests) the society is organized into geographical districts as follows:

 Area 1: Ten chapters, located in Quebec, New Brunswick, Nova Scotia, Newfoundland, Labrador, and Prince Edward Island
 Area 2: Twelve chapters located in Connecticut, Maine, Massachusetts, New Hampshire, Rhode Island, Vermont, and the Province of Quebec south of latitude 46'N
 Area 3: Ten chapters located in Delaware, Maryland, New Jersey, New York, Pennsylvania, Virginia, and West Virginia
 Area 4: Eleven chapters located in Illinois, Indiana, Iowa, Kentucky, Michigan, Missouri, Ohio, Wisconsin, and California Note Catchers chapter
 Area 5: Eight chapters located in Ontario
 Area 6: Nine chapters located in Alabama, Florida, Georgia, Mississippi, North Carolina, South Carolina, Tennessee
 Expansion Area: All other provinces/states of Canada and United States not mentioned in Areas 1 through 6

See also 

 Ladies Association of British Barbershop Singers

References

External links 
 
 The Barbershop Wiki Project

American vocal groups
Barbershop quartets
Organizations based in Providence, Rhode Island
Organizations established in 1959
History of women in Rhode Island